Keith Jones (born November 8, 1968) is a Canadian former professional ice hockey player. He was formerly a hockey studio analyst for NBC/NBCSN. He currently works as the lead color commentator for Philadelphia Flyers games on NBC Sports Philadelphia, and the lead "Inside-the-Glass" reporter on TNT. In 491 NHL games, Jones produced a total of 258 points between 1992 and 2000.

Minor Hockey
Keith grew up in the small town of Paris, Ontario - just outside of Brantford - hometown of Wayne Gretzky.  He played minor hockey for the Paris Wolfpack of the OMHA until Midget before two seasons playing Jr.C. for the Paris Mounties (OHA) at age 17 and 18.

It is believed that Jones is the only player to play Jr.C. level hockey in Ontario at age 18 and eventually crack the National Hockey League.   Two others, Hunter Drew (Anaheim) and Ryan Jones (no relation - Edmonton) played Jr.C. at 17 and eventually cracked the NHL.  Jones played Midget at 16, Jr.C. at 17 and 18 and then Jr.B. at age 19.

At age 19 he moved up to the Niagara Falls Canucks of the Golden Horseshoe Jr.B. hockey league.  It was in Niagara Falls that he secured a hockey scholarship to Western Michigan in 1988.

Playing career
Jones was drafted in the seventh round, 141st overall, of the 1988 NHL Entry Draft by the Washington Capitals. He played his college hockey at Western Michigan University, and professionally for the Capitals, Colorado Avalanche and Philadelphia Flyers. He played in 491 NHL games, scoring 117 goals and assisting on 141 others for a total of 258 points.

Sportscasting career
Beginning with the 2005–2006 NHL season, Jones has worked as an in-studio TV analyst alongside host Bill Clement and analyst Brian Engblom for The NHL on NBC (formerly The NHL on Versus) later host Liam McHugh, Mike Milbury, and Patrick Sharp. In addition to his duties at NBC/NBCSN, Jones also works for NBC Sports Philadelphia as a color commentator and analyst for the Flyers.

In fall 2021, Jones joined TNT/TBS as the lead "Inside-the-Glass" reporter joining the lead broadcast team of Kenny Albert and Eddie Olczyk.

From 2002 until 2023, Jones was a co-host for the show on 94.1 WIP Morning Show. When the show's longtime host, Angelo Cataldi retired, Jones also retired citing a hectic schedule calling hockey games. He appears frequently on TSN as an NHL analyst. In 2007, Jones, along with ESPN SportsCenter anchorman John Buccigross, wrote his autobiography Jonesy: Put Your Head Down and Skate. Along with a foreword by Ray Bourque, the book recounts many of the stories that Jones witnessed throughout his career.

Thoroughbred racing
Keith Jones was one of the partners that owned Wild Desert, winner of the 2005 Queen's Plate. Canada's most prestigious Thoroughbred horserace and the oldest continuously run event in North America, the Queen's Plate is the first leg of the '''Canadian Triple Crown series.

Jones is a resident of Shamong Township, New Jersey.

Career statistics

Awards and honours

References

External links
 

1968 births
Baltimore Skipjacks players
Canadian ice hockey right wingers
Colorado Avalanche players
Hershey Bears players
Ice hockey people from Ontario
Living people
National Hockey League broadcasters
Canadian racehorse owners and breeders
People from Shamong Township, New Jersey
Philadelphia Flyers announcers
Philadelphia Flyers players
Portland Pirates players
Sportspeople from Brantford
Washington Capitals draft picks
Washington Capitals players
Western Michigan Broncos men's ice hockey players